Sir William Dudley, 1st Baronet (c. 1597 - 18 September 1670) was an English politician who sat in the House of Commons in 1663.

Dudley was the son of Edward Dudley of Clopton, Northamptonshire, and his wife Elizabeth Wood, daughter of Robert Wood, of Lamley, Nottinghamshire. He succeeded his elder brother Edward Dudley, who died without issue on  13 November 1641. He was created a baronet on 1 August 1660. He was Sheriff of Northamptonshire from 1660 to 1661,  In March 1663, he was elected Member of Parliament for Northampton but his election was declared void on 9 April.
 
Dudley died at the age of 73 and was buried at Clopton. 

Dudley married three times.  He married firstly a daughter of Monsieur de Pleuee. She died without issue and he married secondly, Jane Smith, daughter of Sir Roger Smith, of Edmondthorpe, Leicestershire. She also died without issue and he married thirdly, Mary Pindar, daughter of Paul Pindar of London who was nephew of Sir Paul Pindar, sometime Ambassador to Constantinople.

References

1590s births
1670 deaths
English MPs 1661–1679
Baronets in the Baronetage of England
High Sheriffs of Northamptonshire
Place of birth missing
People from North Northamptonshire